Calva is a populated place situated in Graham County, Arizona, United States.

History
Calva's population was 50 in 1940.

References

Populated places in Graham County, Arizona